George O. Wagner IV (born April 12, 1946) is a former Republican member of the Pennsylvania House of Representatives.

References

Republican Party members of the Pennsylvania House of Representatives
1946 births
Living people
People from Danville, Pennsylvania